Ratan Lal Jaldhari (born 5 October 1948 in Sikar, Rajasthan) is a Bharatiya Janata Party politician from Rajasthan, India. He has been elected in Rajasthan Legislative Assembly election in 2013 from Sikar constituency.

References 

Living people
Bharatiya Janata Party politicians from Rajasthan
Rajasthan MLAs 2013–2018
People from Sikar
1948 births